Wari Island (also known as Teste Island) is an island in the southwest of the Louisiade Archipelago. Politically it belongs to Milne Bay Province in the southeastern part of Papua New Guinea.

Geography
The island is located 12 km south-east of the Lebrun Islands and 16 km northwest of the Stuers Islands. Wari is approximately 4.7 km long and up to 630 meters wide. It has an area of 2.27. Over the entire length of the island extends a narrow mountain chain that ends in the east and west respectively with a steep peak. The western mountain is 117 m high. A large coral reef is located off the southern coast of Wari.
East Islet and South Islet (Kera Kera) are lying on the same coral reef at a distance of 400 and 950 meters respectively .
1.3 km northwest of the western tip of Wari stands an 81 m high steep rock out of the sea, Ikaikakeino Island (Cliff Rock).
3.8 km to the northwest is the 133 m high rock Mamaramamaweino (Bell Rock) .
Wari was once forested, but now almost bare, the trees were cut down to make firewood for the population.

Demographics
The last census of the Ward was 1300. The main village of Wari, with 129 households is on the southwest coast. the central ridge is too mountainous to have villages. the northeast coast has some Bananas and sugarcane plantations in about 20 households spread across a vast area. 
other villages and camps are on Kosmann Island.
Most population rely on fishing area of the Long / Kosmann reef, more than 100 km to the east, near the Jomard Islands. The villagers share this area with the inhabitants of Utian Island from Calvados Chain. A livelihood of Wari Islander is the production of Beche-de-mer from sea cucumbers, which in China and Southeast Asia is considered a delicacy, and is executed there. The largest share of Beche-de-mer is made from Prickly Redfish. 
The inhabitants of the archipelago speak Bwanabwana Language.

History
Louis Antoine de Bougainville discovered the island on June, 1768.

References

Islands of Milne Bay Province
Louisiade Archipelago